Harmony Classic is a women's barbershop competition for small and mid-sized choruses run by Sweet Adelines International as part of the organisation's annual convention since 2010. The results of the competition are as follows. For a full explanation of the scoring system, qualification process, awards and records, see Sweet Adelines International competition.

Qualification for the competition happens as part of the regional chorus competition. The five highest-scoring small (division A, 15-30 singers) and midsize (division, AA 31–60 singers) choruses across all regional competitions qualify directly for the Harmony Classic of the following year. With five choruses in each of the two divisions (A & AA) a total of 10 choruses compete in this competition each year. Only one chorus from a region may compete in each of the divisions and the previous year's winner may not compete in the same division again the following year. Furthermore, a chorus may not compete in both the main competition and also the Harmony Classic at the same year. A chorus may potentially qualify for both the main chorus competition as well as the Harmony Classic, but are only permitted to compete in one, thereby making a space available for the next highest qualifier to take their place at the other competition.

2000

2001

2002

River City Sound qualified in region 5 but performed as representative of region 22 due to regional boundary changes before the competition.

2003

2004

Song of the Lakes chorus was known as Thumb Area at the regional competition and subsequently changed its name.

2005

2006

2007

The official scoresheet incorrectly lists the Farminton Village score as 1216 which was their total before the bonus points were added.

2008

Spirit of Harmony and Queen City Sound both received the same total score, but Spirit of Harmony was awarded the higher place on the basis of a better score in the "sound" judging category.

2009

2010

2011

2012

2013

2014

Springfield Metro qualified in region 7 but competed representing region 25 due to regional boundary changes before the competition.

2015
The 2015 competition was held on 7 October at the MGM Grand Las Vegas.

2016
The 2016 competition was held on 17 October at the MGM Grand Las Vegas, the first time the competition will have ever been held at the same location twice in a row.

2017
The 2017 competition was held on October 10. As with the 2015 and '16 editions, the 2017 competition was held at the MGM Grand Las Vegas.

2018
The 2018 competition was held on October 17 at The Dome at America's Center in St. Louis, Missouri.

2019
The 2019 competition took place on September 17 at the Smoothie King Center, New Orleans.

References

Sources
Sweet Adelines International homepage
 
Barbershophistory.com homepage
historical chorus results
competition records
Sweet Adelines Scores Yahoo! Group [registration required]

Sweet Adelines International competitions
Barbershop music
Music-related lists
Timelines of music
21st-century timelines